Sarcelles–Saint-Brice station is a railway station located in Saint-Brice-sous-Forêt, France, which also serves Sarcelles. It is on the Épinay-Villetaneuse–Le Tréport-Mers railway. The station is used by Transilien line H trains from Paris to Persan-Beaumont and Luzarches. In 2002, the station served between 2,500 and 7,500 passengers a day. There are three car parks with 163 spaces in total. The Compagnie des chemins de fer du Nord (Nord company) opened the Épinay–Persan-Beaumont via Montsoult section of the Épinay–Le Tréport line in 1877.

References

External links
 

Railway stations in Val-d'Oise
Railway stations in France opened in 1877